The Lifespan Extension Advocacy Foundation (LEAF) is a non-profit organization with mission to support fundamental research on the main mechanisms of aging and age-related diseases and educate the public on the possibility of bringing aging under medical control in order to prevent, postpone and cure age-related diseases. It was founded in 2014 and is based in New York City, New York, USA.

Its activities include a news outlet covering aging research, an annual scientific conference on aging in New York City, and the nonprofit crowdfunding platform Lifespan.io. As of 2020, the platform has hosted eight successful campaigns, including three research projects by SENS Research Foundation.

News outlet 

LEAF established its news outlet in 2016 with the goal of educating the public on the progress in aging and longevity research. As of 2020, it contains over 900 news articles, including over 90 interviews with aging and rejuvenation researchers, such as Aubrey de Grey, Judith Campisi, Brian Kennedy, Steve Horvath, David Sinclair, and Gregory Fahy.

In 2018, LEAF interviewed the Russian geriatrician Valery Novoselov on the questionable case of Jeanne Calment’s exceptional longevity.

Scientific conference 

Ending Age-Related Diseases: Investment Prospects and Advances in Research is an annual scientific conference hosted by LEAF in New York City in the summer. It is focused on biomarkers of aging, fundamental studies on aging, the development of rejuvenation therapies for humans, and investment and regulatory aspects of the longevity industry.

Crowdfunding platform 

LEAF’s non-profit crowdfunding platform Lifespan.io is dedicated to supporting fundamental and early-stage studies on aging.  it helped to collect over $390,000 in support of eight research projects, including three projects by SENS Research Foundation - OncoSENS, MitoSENS and MitoMouse.

Outreach and advocacy 

LEAF maintains a variety of outreach activities. Members of the organizations give talks at scientific and public events, appear on television, and give press interviews. In 2017 and 2018, as a part of its outreach activities, LEAF provided scientific advice to help the YouTube channels Kurzgesagt, Life Noggin, and CGP Grey create educational popular science videos about biological aging and the potential of regenerative medicine.

See also

References

External links 
 

Life extension organizations
2014 introductions
Non-profit organizations based in New York City